Boletus glabellus is a fungus of the genus Boletus native to North America. It was described in 1888 from species collected near Menands, New York by American mycologist Charles Horton Peck.

See also
 List of Boletus species
 List of North American boletes

References

External links
 

glabellus
Fungi described in 1888
Fungi of North America
Taxa named by Charles Horton Peck